Dębski (feminine: Dębska; plural: Dębscy) or Debski is a Polish-language surname. It is sometimes written Dembski due to its pronunciation. The surname may refer to:

 Eugeniusz Dębski (born 1952), Polish writer and translator
 Krzesimir Dębski (born 1953), Polish composer
 Rafał Dębski (born 1969), Polish writer
 Sławomir Dębski (born 1971), Polish historian
 Tadeusz Debski (1921–2011), Polish survivor of the Nazi concentration camps
 Zbigniew Dębski (1922–2010), member of the Polish army

See also 
 Dembski
 Demski

References 

Polish-language surnames